On September 12, 2020, two deputies of the Los Angeles County Sheriff's Department were shot and critically injured while sitting in their patrol car in an ambush-style attack at a LA Metro station in Compton, California. Police arrested suspect Deonte Lee Murray on September 15, 2020 and prosecutors charged him on September 30, 2020 with attempted murder.

President Donald Trump and then-Democratic presidential nominee Joe Biden denounced the attack on law enforcement.

References

2020 in Los Angeles County, California
Non-fatal shootings
September 2020 crimes in the United States
Compton, California
Crimes in Los Angeles County, California
Anti-police violence in the United States
Law enforcement in California
Los Angeles County Sheriff's Department